There are a number of listed buildings in Jersey. These listed buildings, which includes structures such as pumps, range from castles to terraced houses.

The list is controlled by the States of Jersey and is based on a system of historic environment protection.

Grouville

St Brélade

St Clement

St Helier

St John

St Lawrence

St Martin

St Mary

St Ouen

St Peter

St Saviour

Trinity

References

External links
 Listed buildings database

 
Jersey-related lists